Swig is a drive-through soda-fountain chain located primarily in the western United States. The chain is known for their "dirty sodas." Swig was founded in St. George, Utah by Nicole Tanner in April 2010, and has grown to include locations in six states. The first location was located directly across the street from Dixie State University (now Utah Tech University).

History 
Nicole Tanner opened the first Swig store along with her husband Todd Tanner in St. George, Utah in 2010.

Tanner found that while she and her husband enjoyed pebble ice drinks such as those served at Sonic, they found it could be inconvenient waiting in line behind others who were ordering food just to get drinks. Tanner founded Swig as a drink-focused restaurant, serving a limited menu of items from a local bakery.

The concept proved immensely popular, and a second store was opened in St. George in 2011.

In 2013, Swig was covered in a local-news story as a must-visit spring break destination which the company credits with having launched their popularity statewide.

In 2015, Swig sued competitor soda-fountain chain Sodalicious over their use of the term "dirty soda" (see below), which Swig claimed that it had trademarked in 2013. Sodalicious argued that the term was generic and thus could not be trademarked. The lawsuit ended with an undisclosed settlement in 2017.

By 2017, the company had 16 locations and more franchise offers from outside of Utah. The same year, Nicole Tanner sold the chain to the restaurant management firm Four Foods Group.

As of 2018, the company headquarters is located in American Fork, Utah.

In 2021, Swig expanded into Idaho, Oklahoma and Texas.

On November 22, the Larry H. Miller Company purchased a majority stake in Swig, Savory Fund, Swig founder Nicole Tanner, and partners Chase Wardrop and Dylan Roede each retained significant minority equity in the chain.

As of 2023, Swig has announced that it will open 25 corporate-owned locations and start a franchising program. Megaplex Theatres, will start selling Swig products in 2023.

Products 
Swig is well known for their "dirty" sodas, which are made by mixing base name-brand sodas such as Coca-Cola or Dr. Pepper with add-ins such as flavored syrups, creams and fruit-purees. The chain also sells semi-frozen cookies with recognizable pink frosting.

Popularity in Utah 
The popularity of soda-fountain chains such as Swig in Utah can largely be traced to the influence of the Church of Jesus Christ of Latter-day Saints (LDS). Members of the LDS Church (which includes over half of all Utahns) are prohibited from consuming alcohol or hot caffeinated beverages such as tea or coffee. As such, many LDS Church members frequently drink soda in order to consume caffeine. The vast majority of all Swig locations are in the state of Utah.

References 

2010 establishments in Utah
Restaurants established in 2010
Restaurants in Utah
Fast-food chains of the United States
Fast-food franchises